Sadiq is an Arabic masculine given name. Originally a word in Arabic صديق which is translated as friend. The Arabic word for friend is derived from the root sdk صدق which often refers to honesty, sincerity, truth or loyalty. Variants of the name include Sadek, Sadiq, Siddiq, Siddique etc. Notable people with the name include:

 Sadik Ahmed (born 1977), British Bangladeshi film director, cinematographer, writer, producer
 Sadik Albayrak (born 1942), Turkish journalist and author
Sadik Balarabe (born 1992), English footballer
 Sadık Giz (1911-1979), Turkish politician
 Sadik Hakim (1919-1983), American jazz pianist
 Sadik Harchaoui (born 1973), Moroccan-Dutch legal academic
 Sadik Kaceli (1914-2000), Albanian painter
 Sadiq Khan (born 1970), Mayor of London
 Sadik Mikhou (born 1990), Moroccan middle distance runner
 Sadik Mujkič (born 1968), Slovenian rower
 Sadik Yemni (born 1951), Dutch novelist of Turkish extraction

See also
 
 Sadik (comics), an Italian crime comic book series
 Sadik 2, a 2013 French horror movie
Sadek (disambiguation)
Sadiq (disambiguation)
Sadegh (disambiguation)
Siddique (disambiguation)
Sadique

References

Arabic masculine given names
Turkish masculine given names